Porto Alegre Futebol Clube, usually known simply as Porto Alegre, is a Brazilian football club from Porto Alegre, Brazil. It is owned by former footballer Roberto Assis, Ronaldinho's brother.

History

Lami
The club was founded on June 10, 2003, as Lami Futebol Clube.

In 2003, Lami won its first title, the Campeonato Gaúcho Third Level.

Porto Alegre
In 2006, the club was bought by Roberto Assis and renamed to Porto Alegre Futebol Clube.

Club colors
Porto Alegre's colors are inspired by the two most popular Rio Grande do Sul football clubs, Grêmio and Internacional, and Spanish club FC Barcelona. The home kit is composed of red and white vertical stripes, white shorts and red socks. The away kit is like FC Barcelona's home kit, being composed of blue and red vertical stripes, blue shorts and blue socks. The third kit is composed of a three-colored vertical sash in a black shirt, white shorts and gray socks.

Flamengo
In 2010 the Porto Alegre mediated a partnership with the Flamengo the intention is use the structure of Porto Alegre, that is magnificent.

Achievements

Regional 
 Campeonato Gaúcho Third Level:
 Winners (1): 2003
 Campeonato Gaúcho Second Level:
 Winners (1): 2009

Season records

Current squad
As of December 2010, according to combined sources on the official website.

Youth squad

Professional players able to play in the youth team

Youth players with first team experience

Out on loan

First-team staff
As of December 28, 2010

Stadium

Estádio João da Silva Moreira
Porto Alegre play their home games at Estádio João da Silva Moreira (also known as Parque Lami).

Presidents

References

External links
Porto Alegre Futebol Clube official website 

 
Association football clubs established in 2003
Football clubs in Rio Grande do Sul
2003 establishments in Brazil